Laminilabrum is a genus of sea snails, marine gastropod mollusks in the family Laubierinidae.

Species
 Laminilabrum breviaxe Kuroda & Habe, 1961

References

 Habe T. (1961). Coloured illustrations of the shells of Japan (II). Hoikusha, Osaka. xii + 183 + 42 pp., 66 pls.

External links
  Warén, A.; Bouchet, P. (1990). Laubierinidae and Pisanianurinae (Ranellidae), two new deep-sea taxa of the Tonnoidea (Gastropoda: Prosobranchia). Veliger. 33(1): 56-102
 Strong E.E., Puillandre N., Beu A.G., Castelin M. & Bouchet P. (2019). Frogs and tuns and tritons – A molecular phylogeny and revised family classification of the predatory gastropod superfamily Tonnoidea (Caenogastropoda). Molecular Phylogenetics and Evolution. 130: 18-34

Laubierinidae